Eleven Football Pro, or simply EFP, is a women's football club based in Zouk Mosbeh, Lebanon, section of the homonymous sports academy. Founded in 2019, they compete in the Lebanese Women's Football League and have won one Lebanese Women's FA Cup.

History
Eleven Football Pro were founded in 2019. In 2019–20, their debut season, EFP came third in the league, after losing 4–2 to SAS in the final matchday of the season. They won their first trophy in 2021, winning the 2020–21 Lebanese Women's FA Cup final after beating BFA on penalties.

Honours
Lebanese Women's FA Cup
Winners (1): 2020–21

 Lebanese Women's Super Cup
 Runners-up (1): 2021–22

See also
 Lebanese Women's Football League
 Women's football in Lebanon
 List of women's association football clubs in Lebanon

References

External links

 

Eleven Football Pro
Women's football clubs in Lebanon
Association football clubs established in 2019
2019 establishments in Lebanon